Adam Ahmed Marjan (born 23 September 1957) is a Kuwaiti football goalkeeper who played for Kuwait in the 1982 FIFA World Cup. He also played for Kazma Sporting Club.

References

External links
 

1957 births
Kuwaiti footballers
Kuwait international footballers
Association football goalkeepers
1980 AFC Asian Cup players
1982 FIFA World Cup players
AFC Asian Cup-winning players
Living people
Asian Games medalists in football
Footballers at the 1982 Asian Games
Asian Games silver medalists for Kuwait
Medalists at the 1982 Asian Games
Kazma SC players
Kuwait Premier League players
Kazma SC managers
Kuwait Premier League managers